Račice is a municipality and village in Rakovník District in the Central Bohemian Region of the Czech Republic. It has about 300 inhabitants. It lies on the Berounka River.

References

Villages in Rakovník District